Forest Hill Calvary Cemetery is a cemetery in Kansas City, Missouri.

History
The Forest Hill Calvary Cemetery was established in 1888. George Kessler served as the landscape architect when the cemetery was established.

It is located at 69th Street and Troost Avenue.

Notable burials
 Edward Robert Atwill (1840–1911), bishop of Episcopal Diocese of West Missouri
 Charles A. Baird (1870–1944), athletic director at University of Michigan
 John L. Barkley (1895–1966), U.S. Medal of Honor recipient
 Harold Roe Bartle (1901–1974), businessman, philanthropist, executive, mayor of Kansas City, Missouri, namesake of Kansas City Chiefs
 Albert I. Beach (1883–1939), mayor of Kansas City, Missouri
 Daniel Morgan Boone (1769–1839), pioneer, explorer and frontiersman
 Louis C. Boyle (1866–1925), Kansas Attorney General and lawyer
 Walter Halben Butler (1852–1931), U.S. Representative from Iowa, newspaperman and lawyer
 Arthur Chapman (1863–1928), member of the Missouri House of Representatives
 Laurie Perry Cookingham (1896–1992), city manager of multiple cities, including Kansas City, Missouri and Fort Worth, Texas
 Thomas T. Crittenden (1832–1909), Governor of Missouri
 Thomas T. Crittenden Jr. (1863–1938), mayor of Kansas City, Missouri
 Jesse M. Donaldson (1885–1970), U.S. Postmaster General
 Tatiana Dokoudovska (1921–2005), French ballet dancer
 Bobby Greenlease (1947–1953), six-year-old kidnapping and homicide victim
 J. C. Hall (1891–1982), founder and chief executive of Hallmark Cards
 Sid J. Hare (1860–1938), landscape architect
 John L. Harrington (1868–1942), civil engineer and bridge designer
 Waldo P. Johnson (1817–1885), Confederate States and U.S. Senator from Missouri
 William Thornton Kemper Sr. (1867–1938), Kansas City banker
 Bertha Mae Lillenas (1889–1945), evangelist and hymn writer
 Homer B. Mann (1869–1950), president of Park College, insurance businessman and state politician
 Jay H. Neff (1854–1915), mayor of Kansas City, Missouri and newspaperman
 J. C. Nichols (1880–1950), real estate developer
 Satchel Paige (1906–1982), American baseball player in Negro league and Major League Baseball, member of the National Baseball Hall of Fame
 Sidney Catlin Partridge (1857–1930), bishop of Kyoto, bishop of Episcopal Diocese of West Missouri
 Joseph M. Patterson (1837–1914), member of the Illinois Senate
 Tom Pendergast (1872–1945), Political boss in Kansas City from 1925 to 1939
 Mason S. Peters (1844–1914), U.S. Representative from Kansas
 Charles H. Price II (1931–2012), businessman and U.S. ambassador to the United Kingdom and Belgium
 John H. Ricksecker (1843–1929), Civil War Medal of Honor recipient
 Frank P. Sebree (1854–1940), lawyer and member of the Missouri House of Representatives
 Joe Shannon (1867–1943), U.S. Representative from Missouri and Democratic political boss
 Joseph O. Shelby (1830–1897), Confederate States Army general
 George M. Shelley (1850–1929), Mayor of Kansas City
 Kenneth A. Spencer (1902–1960), coal miner and philanthropist
 Robert Nelson Spencer (1877–1961), bishop of Episcopal Diocese of West Missouri
 Carrie Westlake Whitney (1854–1934), librarian and first director of Kansas City Public Library
 Hazel Browne Williams (1907–1986), educator at University of Missouri–Kansas City

See also
 List of cemeteries in Missouri

References

External links
 Forest Hill Calvary Cemetery

External links

Cemeteries in Missouri
1888 establishments in Missouri